Ips pini, known generally as the pine engraver or North American pine engraver, is a species of typical bark beetle in the family Curculionidae. Males construct nuptial chambers in the bark of dead pine or spruce trees. Ips pini is a tremendous pest when it comes to pines, but mostly of mature red pine plantations. When humans try to get rid of them by try to burn their habitat, it makes them reproduce even more. As trees get wider, their population ends up competing with other species, but mostly because of the temperature and the chemicals used to stop them is helping the beetle even more.

They are polygynous. After mating, the females create ovipositional chambers off of the nuptial chamber and lay eggs within the gallery.

References

Further reading

External links

 

Scolytinae
Articles created by Qbugbot